Bit Pilot is an action game developed by Zach Gage. It was released on March 4, 2010 for iOS. In it, players control a spaceship and must attempt to dodge as many asteroids as possible without being able to shoot. It received largely positive reviews from critics, citing its gameplay, controls and soundtrack.

Reception 
Bit Pilot received an score of 78 out of 100 on Metacritic based on 9 reviews, indicating "generally favorable reviews".

Edge awarded the game 8/10 points, calling it distinctive due to its gesture-based control scheme, which is "uncommonly nuanced and tactile". The A.V. Club gave the game an "A" rating, calling it a "tough, unbeatable game" with "atrocious challenge". Tracy Erickson of Pocket Gamer UK gave the game 3.5/5 stars and the Bronze award, calling it "an amusing, bite-sized piece of gaming", and saying that while it "travels a familiar course", "the manner in which it's presented makes this old formula fresh".

References 

Action video games
Indie video games
IOS games
Video games designed by Zach Gage
2010 video games
Single-player video games
Video games developed in the United States
Video games set in outer space